Behavioral engineering, also called applied behavior analysis, is intended to identify issues associated with the interface of technology and the human operators in a system and to generate recommended design practices that consider the strengths and limitations of the human operators.

Watson wrote in 1924 "Behaviorism ... holds that the subject matter of human psychology is the behavior of the human being. Behaviorism claims that consciousness is neither a definite nor a usable concept." 

This approach is often used in organizational behavior management, which is behavior analysis applied to organizations and behavioral community psychology.

Success of approach
Behavioral engineering has been used to increase safety in organizations (see Behavior-based safety). Other areas include performance in organization and lessening problems in prison. In addition, it has had some success in social service systems, understanding the long-term effects of humans in space and developing the human landscape, understanding political behavior in organizations, and understanding how organizations function.

It has also been successful in helping individuals to set goals and manage pay systems. Behavioral engineering has also been applied to social welfare policy.

In the school system behavioral engineering has inspired two programs of behavior management based on the principles of applied behavior analysis in a social learning format. Programs were successful in reducing disruption in children with conduct disorders, as well as improving their academic achievement. The programs show good maintenance and generalization of treatment effects when the child was returned to the natural classroom. In addition, the programs were successfully replicated. Behavior analytic programs continued to function to control truancy and reduce delinquency.

The journal Behavioral Engineering was published from 1973–1985. Many of the topics of behavioral engineering are now covered in the journals Behavior and Social Issues, The Behavior Analyst and  the Journal of Organizational Behavior Management.

Related topics
 Applied behavior analysis
 Behaviour therapy
 Behavior modification
 Behavior management
 Professional practice of behavior analysis
 Behaviourism

References

Behavioral concepts 
Applied psychology
Behavior modification